The Buddha Temple is a temple dedicated to Buddha, at Perunjeri, Mayiladuthurai district, Tamil Nadu, India.

Location
The temple is one of the Buddha temples in Tamil Nadu, and is located at Perunjeri in Mayiladuthurai-Thiruvarur road at a distance of 0.5 km in Sundrappanchavadi-Kilianur road.

Statue
The Buddha statue in this temple is 5' and 3 inch height. In the pedestal of the statue, a not so clear Tamil inscription is found. Earlier this statue was found at a distance of one furlong from this place.  The usual iconographical features such as coiled her, flame atop the head, elongated ears and upper garment are found in this statue.

Rishi
Earlier, this temple was called as Rishi Temple.

Worship 
This temple is under worship now. Locals light lamp in this temple.

Reference